Blue Ridge High School is a high school situated between Greer, South Carolina and Taylors, South Carolina, United States. It is under the jurisdiction of Greenville County School District.

Demographics

In the 2018–2019 school year, Blue Ridge had 1,148 students and 65 teachers. Of those students, 89% were White, 4.2% were Hispanic, and 3.9 African-American, 39.4% of students were deemed to be under the federal poverty line, 13.7% were receiving special education, and 16.4% were in gifted and talented programs. The student to teacher ratio, 18:1, is higher than the state average of 16:1.

History
Blue Ridge High School opened in 1954, as a consolidation of Jordan and Mountain View High Schools. The population of the area grew as the region changed from its rural, agrian origins, and a new school site was purchased in 1971; however, the new high school did not open until 1986. The original site of Blue Ridge High School is now  Blue Ridge Middle School.

References

Public high schools in South Carolina
Schools in Greenville County, South Carolina